Hamid bin Abdullah bin Hussein al-Ahmar (born 1967) is a Yemeni politician currently living in exile after fleeing Yemen during the Houthi takeover of Sana'a September 2014. He is the former general secretary of the Preparatory Committee of the National Dialogue for the JMP and a member of opposition party Yemeni Congregation for Reform, commonly known as Islah.

He is a son of Abdullah ibn Husayn al-Ahmar, the former head of the Hashid tribal confederacy of Islah which is now headed by Hamid's older brother Sadeq who's living in the capital Sanaa, and the former Speaker of the Yemeni HR since 1993. Senior Al-ahmer has been known in Yemen as the presidents' maker and breaker. His uncle, after whom he is named, was executed by the Yemeni Imam Ahmed Hameed Al-deen (1948–1962) during the Yemeni civil war of 1962–1968. "After all, the heinous murder of his ambitious uncle and grandfather led his father to mobilize the Hashid tribes, normally supporters of the Imam, to the side of the revolution when it broke out in north Yemen in 1962. The efforts of his father, family, and tribesmen eventually led to the permanent demise of the Imamate’s 11 centuries' rule."

As a youth, he spent summers in either the United States or the United Kingdom, staying with a family to learn English. He earned a bachelor's degree in economics with honors at Sana'a University. He went into buying, eventually owning cellular telecom Sabafon, the Islamic Bank of Saba, and at least a dozen other businesses which most of them have now been seized by the Houthi militia.

He has been a member of the Yemeni House of Representatives (HR) since the 1993 parliamentary elections. He has been a member of the Shoura Council of the Yemeni Congregation for Reform party which is known by its short Arabic name Islah, meaning "reform." At the beginning of 2007, he was elevated to the Higher Commission of the party, which is equivalent to a political bureau.

While not occupying any formal position within the Yemeni opposition parties coalition which is known as the Joint Meeting Parties—JMP. He is credited for leading the Yemeni opposition in a presidential elections battle against Saleh in September 2006. Hameed's success in the past is attributed to his very influential political family (Al-ahmer) of the now fragmented and weakened Hashid tribal coalition which once dominated Yemen's politics until the Houthi takeover of Sana'a.

See also
2011 Yemeni protests
Political parties in Yemen

References

External links
The Yemeni Opposition’s strong man, Dr. Abdullah Al-Faqeh, Yemen Times, 27 December 2007
Saleh’s Son Lashes at Sheik Hamid al-Ahmar, Vows to Face 'Plots', Mohammed Al-Amrani, Yemen Tribune, 15 November 2009
Sheikh Hameed Al-Ahmar to Yemen Times: "The real threat to Yemen’s unity and stability is this current regime", Yemen Times, 1 March 2011, extensive interview
Yemen security blames Islah leader for Friday massacre, Nasser Arrabyee, Yemen Observer, 21 March 2011
Kingmaker seeks stable, developed Yemen, Abigail Fielding-Smith in Sana’a, Financial Times, 25 March 2011
Yemen's Hamid al-Ahmar urges President Saleh to leave, BBC News, 31 March 2011

1967 births
Living people
Members of the House of Representatives (Yemen)
Al-Islah (Yemen) politicians
People of the Yemeni Revolution
Sanaa University alumni
People from Amran Governorate
21st-century Yemeni politicians
21st-century Yemeni businesspeople